Anova Music is an Israeli independent record label founded in 2006, by Shuki Goldwasser and Anat Damon in Tel Aviv, Israel. They have signed bands such as Vaadat Charigim, Nikmat HaTraktor, Rockfour and more artists on their roster. In 2013, Anova Music started a sub label by the name of BLDG5 Records that specializes in electronic music. Walla! referred to the label as "one of the most prominent alternative labels in Israel".

Anova Studios
Anova studios were founded in January 2006 in Tel Aviv, Israel.

Artists

Past Artists

Deluxe Editions
Starting in 2008, Anova Music has released Deluxe Editions of their top-selling albums, which features the remastered album as well as some live tracks. The albums with Deluxe Editions are Electra's Second Hand Love, Nosei Hamigbaat's Nosei Hamigbaat, Nikmat HaTraktor Ma Le'ahuvee and more.

See also
List of record labels

References

External links
Anova Music Official Website - http://www.anovamusic.com/

Record labels established in 2006
Israeli independent record labels
Rock record labels
Pop record labels